Roli Mosimann is a drummer, electronic musician and record producer who has worked in genres ranging from industrial to pop.  Originally from Switzerland, Mosimann first came to attention with the New York City no wave band Swans and later collaborated with Foetus leader J. G. Thirlwell in the duo Wiseblood.

As a producer, Mosimann has worked with That Petrol Emotion, The Young Gods, The The, Celtic Frost, New Order and The Hair and Skin Trading Company, and helped birth Faith No More's Album of the Year, among others. He was an early producer for Skinny Puppy's The Process and Marilyn Manson's Portrait of an American Family; however, both bands were unsatisfied with the results and chose to finish those albums with other producers (Martin Atkins and Trent Reznor, respectively).

Roli Mosimann has most recently worked with Jojo Mayer and Miloopa (engineering and mixing the latter band's "Unicode" album).

References

External links

Year of birth missing (living people)
Living people
Swiss electronic musicians
Noise rock musicians
Swans (band) members
Swiss record producers
Swiss drummers
Swiss male musicians
Male drummers
Swiss audio engineers
Swiss expatriates in the United States
Swiss rock musicians
Industrial musicians